Max Eugene Druen (August 19, 1928 – February 20, 2003) was a Canadian football player who played for the Saskatchewan Roughriders. He played college football at Tulane University.

References

1928 births
2003 deaths
American football guards
Canadian football guards
American players of Canadian football
Tulane Green Wave football players
Saskatchewan Roughriders players
Players of American football from Oklahoma